Insight Productions is a Canadian production company based in Toronto, Ontario. It was established in 1970. Insight is led by CEO John Brunton.

History 

Insight Productions was established in 1970 by Penray "Pen" Densham and John Kingsley Watson.

In December 1978, John Brunton, assistant editor and director with Insight, bought the rights to the company from Densham and Watson, becoming president and CEO.

Insight has created programs in several genres (documentary, drama, sports, variety, comedy, music, reality), and has adapted to shifting tastes, technology and formats. Canadian Idol, an Insight-produced iteration of the successful international format, aired between 2004 and 2008 to record-breaking audiences.

Insight is also credited with revamping Canada's national music awards, Juno Awards. By moving the show from a theatre to an arena setting, Insight was ultimately able to take the show on the road to cities across the country.

John Brunton and Barbara Bowlby were awarded the Order of Canada in 2018.

The company released the documentary film Life Times Nine in 1973 for which it was nominated for two Academy Awards.

The company faces a class-action lawsuit over unpaid wages.

Recent productions include Big Brother Canada, The Amazing Race Canada, Canada's New Year's Eve: Countdown to 2021, Every Child Matters: Reconciliation Through Education, Juno Awards, Wall of Chefs, Battle of the Blades, Gordon Lightfoot: If You Could Read My Mind, The Launch, Canada's Walk of Fame, Top Chef Canada, I Do, Redo, The Tragically Hip: A National Celebration, and Stronger Together, Tous Ensemble. On April 13, 2021, Amazon Prime Video announced Jay Baruchel will host a Canadian version of LOL: Last One Laughing to be produced by Insight.

Filmography

Television

 Are You Smarter than a Canadian 5th Grader?
 A Russell Peters Christmas
 A Christmas Fury
 The Amazing Race Canada
 The Artistry of Torvill and Dean
 Battle of the Blades
 Big Brother Canada
 Canada Day 150
 Canada's Got Talent
 Canadian Idol
 Canada's Walk of Fame
 Canada’s New Year’s Eve: Countdown to 2021
 Canada’s New Year’s Eve: Countdown to 2022
 Deal or No Deal Canada
 Disney's Animal Kingdom: The First Adventure
 Eurovision Canada
 Every Child Matters: Reconciliation Through Education
 Falcon Beach
 Hatching, Matching and Dispatching
 Heart of Gold
 The Goods
 How to Look Good Naked Canada
 I Do, Redo
 Indigo
 It's Only Rock & Roll
 Intervention Canada
 Jamie & David: A Golden Homecoming
 Jann Arden: Live at Last
 Joni Mitchell: Painting with Words and Music
 The Jon Dore Television Show
 Juno Awards
 Kurt Browning: Ice Legends
 Kurt Browning: You Must Remember This
 Kurt Browning: Tall in the Saddle
 The Launch
 LOL: Last One Laughing Canada
 VJ Search
 Music Without Borders
 Never Ever Do This at Home
 One World: The Concert for Tsunami Relief
 Open Mike with Mike Bullard
 Project Runway Canada
 Ready or Not
 Test Pattern
 Top Chef Canada
 Saying Goodbye
 Scott Hamilton: Upside Down
 The Seán Cullen Show
 Seán Cullen Home for Christmas
 Sonic Temple
 Sponk!
 Star Racer
 Stars on Ice
 Stolen Hearts
 Stronger Together, Tous Ensemble
 The Truth About Alex
 Toller Cranston: A Tribute
 Wall of Chefs
 The Wave

Documentaries

 How to Change the World
 Gordon Lightfoot: If You Could Read My Mind
 The Tragically Hip: A National Celebration
Comedy Gold: The Hilarious Story of Canadian Comedy

Digital

 Joke or Choke
 But I'm Chris Jericho!
 Damaged

References

External links
 

Television broadcasting companies of Canada
Television production companies of Canada
Companies based in Toronto
Mass media companies established in 1970
1970 establishments in Ontario
Canadian companies established in 1970